Jagmohan Singh is an Indian name and may refer to
 Jagmohan Singh (activist) one of the leaders of the 2020–2021 Indian farmers' protest
 Jagmohan Singh (athlete) (1932–2020), Indian hurdler 
 Jagmohan Singh Kang a minister and politician from Punjab India
 Jagjit Singh an Indian Ghazal singer's birth name